Karahaxhë is a small village in Vlorë County, southern Albania. At the 2015 local government reform it became part of the municipality of Finiq. It is inhabited solely by Greeks.

Demographics 
According to Ottoman statistics, the village had 31 inhabitants in 1895. The village had 435 inhabitants in 1993, all ethnically Greeks.

References 

Villages in Vlorë County
Greek communities in Albania